Elina Virtaala (born November 29, 1965) is a Finnish curler and curling coach.

Teams

Women's

Mixed

Mixed doubles

Record as a coach of national teams

References

External links

Living people
1965 births
Finnish female curlers
Finnish curling champions
Finnish curling coaches
Place of birth missing (living people)